Turenne is both a surname, and the seat of various titles of nobility, which therefore end with "de Turenne". 

Those bearing the surname or such a title include:

 Marie (or Marguerite) de Turenne, a.k.a. Maria de Ventadorn (fl. c. 1200), French poet and collector
 Claudine de la Tour-Turenne (1520–1591), French Countess
 Henri de La Tour d'Auvergne, Duke of Bouillon (1555–1623), French military leader & politician
 Henri de la Tour d'Auvergne, Vicomte de Turenne (1611–1675), French military leader 
 Armand de Turenne (1891–1980), French air soldier
 Henri de Turenne (1921–2016), French writer
 Louis Turenne (born 1933), Canadian actor 
 Darcy Turenne (born 1984), Canadian bicyclist
 Woodny Turenne (born 1987), American football player

See also 
 Raoul of Turenne (fl. 840 to 866), French religious leader
 Viscounts of Turenne and princes of Sedan in junior line of House of La Tour d'Auvergne